O Homem Que Desafiou o Diabo (Portuguese for The Man who Defied the Devil) is a 2007 Brazilian comedy film directed and co-written by Moacyr Góes. It stars Marcos Palmeira, Flávia Alessandra, Lívia Falcão, Sérgio Mamberti and Fernanda Paes Leme.

2007 films
Brazilian comedy films
2000s Portuguese-language films
2007 comedy films
Films shot in Rio Grande do Norte